Randleman may refer to:

 Randleman (surname)
 Randleman, North Carolina, a city
 Randleman High School
 Randleman Graded School, a historic school building
 Randleman Lake, a reservoir